is a former Japanese football player.

Playing career
Inoue was born in Niiza on May 28, 1977. After graduating from University of Tsukuba, he joined J2 League club Consadole Sapporo in 2000. However he could not play at all in the match behind Yohei Sato and Yosuke Fujigaya until 2003. In 2004, he moved to Japan Football League (JFL) club Yokogawa Musashino. He became a regular goalkeeper and played many matches until 2006. In 2007, he moved to JFL club Gainare Tottori. He played many matches as regular goalkeeper until 2008. However he could not play at all in the match behind Junnosuke Schneider in 2009 and Kiyomitsu Kobari in 2010. The club was promoted to J2 from 2011 and he played several matches from 2011. However he could not play many matches and retired end of 2012 season.

Club statistics

References

External links

1977 births
Living people
University of Tsukuba alumni
Association football people from Saitama Prefecture
Japanese footballers
J1 League players
J2 League players
Japan Football League players
Hokkaido Consadole Sapporo players
Tokyo Musashino United FC players
Gainare Tottori players
Association football goalkeepers